Black and Blue Heart is a studio album by Australian singer–songwriter Russell Morris. It was released on 5 April 2019 by Liberation Records. Upon release Morris said "The band, the producers, the studio… it all fell into place beautifully but the songs came from where I came from. I went back to the well and I drank from the fountainhead, and this is the result."

The album was promoted by an Australian tour starting in Darwin on 12 April and concluding in Bentleigh East on 28 June 2019.

Reception
Zoë Radas from Stack Magazine said the album was produced by Bernard Fanning and Nick DiDia and called it "an unlikely partnership" but added "they have helped Morris craft perhaps his finest album. As producers, they're not afraid to allow the songs to breathe. Less is more on this record, where the songs slowly get under your skin." adding "Morris' voice sounds as fresh as when he was starting out, though seared with decades of wisdom."

Track listing

Charts

Release history

References

2019 albums
Russell Morris albums